The Wood River is a river in the U.S. states of Connecticut and Rhode Island. There are 8 dams along the river's length.

Sources
The Wood River's source is in the swamps northeast of Porter Pond in Sterling, Connecticut. From there, it flows southeast to Hazard Pond, where the river crosses into Rhode Island. From the state line, it flows southeast past Escoheag Hill and over Stepstone Falls, then south through Beach Pond State Park where it receives the Flat River.

After receiving the Flat River, the Wood continues south through the Arcadia Management Area and into the towns of Richmond and Hopkinton, where it flows through the villages of Wyoming and Hope Valley. The river continues south through Hopkinton where it converges with the Pawcatuck River at the village of Alton. The Wood River serves as the border between Richmond and Hopkinton.

The upper Wood River, from its source to Stepstone Falls, is known locally as the Falls River.

Major Resource to the Community
The Wood River, located in Southwestern Rhode Island, is a protected and beneficial source of water to the Northeast Corridor. The Wood River is one of the last remaining pristine bodies of water in the Northeast between New York and Boston. According to the Wood-Pawcatuck Watershed Association, “The Pawcatuck Watershed provides drinking water to over 100,000 residents”. There are various laws that have been created in order to preserve this natural source. The Wood-Pawcatuck Watershed Association's (WPWA's) mission is to protect the land and water of the Wood-Pawcatuck River from any pollution, such as boating, in order to protect the water sources for more than ten towns. The River has been considered one of the most untouched for several years, thanks to the WPWA. The WPWA works to monitor the use of any non-electric-powered boats entering the river, as this could be a major cause of pollution. The Wood River is opposed to the use of any contaminating factors because so many people fish in the river and often eat the catch of the day. The water in the river is also used by visitors to and residents in the area.

There are several access points along the river. As well as being known as one of the most pristine rivers in the Northeast, the Wood River's pure waters also offer a source for several other activities and family fun. Families can enjoy boating and fishing all year long. Many visitors come to Rhode Island and Connecticut to enjoy canoeing, kayaking, fishing, and even hiking along the water's edge. With traffic being so heavy along the river, it is important to preserve the river. Cleanliness and fun at the river go hand in hand.

Wood-Pawcatuck Watershed Association
The Wood-Pawcatuck Watershed Association (WPWA) is the main reason why the Wood River has remained so pure over the years. The WPWA monitors the use of non-electric-powered boats entering the river, a potential source of pollution for the river, it's eco-system and surrounding land. The WPWA is opposed to the use of any contaminating factors because many people fish in the river and often eat the catch of the day. The river is used by visitors to the area and local residents. The U.S. Environmental Protection Agency stated that “The Pawcatuck Basin Aquifer System is the sole source of drinking water for the residents of that area; there are no viable alternative sources of sufficient supply; the boundaries of the designated area and project review area have been reviewed and approved by EPA; and if contamination were to occur, it would pose a significant public health hazard and a serious financial burden to the area's residents.”

Crossings
Below is a list of all crossings over the Wood River. The list starts at the headwaters and goes downstream.
Sterling
Porter Pond Road
West Greenwich
Hazard Road
Falls River Road
Exeter
Ten Rod Road (RI 165)
Arcadia Road
Richmond
Skunk Hill Road
Bridge Street
Hopkinton
Main Street (RI 3)
Switch Road
Interstate 95
Hope Valley Road
Woodville Road
Church Street

Tributaries
In addition to many unnamed tributaries, the following brooks and rivers feed the Wood:
Carson Brook
Kelley Brook
Flat River
Parris Brook
Roaring Brook
Baker Brook
Brushy Brook
Diamond Brook
Canonchet Brook

See also
List of rivers in Connecticut
List of rivers in Rhode Island

References
Maps from the United States Geological Survey

Rivers of Windham County, Connecticut
Rivers of New London County, Connecticut
Rivers of Kent County, Rhode Island
Rivers of Washington County, Rhode Island
West Greenwich, Rhode Island
Hopkinton, Rhode Island
Richmond, Rhode Island
Exeter, Rhode Island
Rivers of Connecticut
Rivers of Rhode Island
Tributaries of Pawcatuck River
Wild and Scenic Rivers of the United States